Dirk Lohan (born 1938, Rathenow, Germany) is a US architect and principal partner at Lohan Architecture. He studied architecture with his grandfather, Ludwig Mies van der Rohe, and worked with him on projects like the New National Gallery in Berlin and the Chicago IBM office building. 
His own works include McDonald's former Corporate Headquarters campus in Oak Brook, the John G. Shedd Oceanarium and the Soldier Field stadium expansion and renovation.

Dirk Lohan is known as the continuator of the work of his grandfather and an expert on its conservation. He is also one of the main characters of the comic Mies by Agustín Ferrer Casas, where he accompanies his grandfather on a trip to Europe and Mies van der Rohe speaks with him about his life and work during the flight.

References

20th-century American architects
21st-century American architects
International style architects